Paratheta calyptra is a moth in the family Cosmopterigidae. It was described by Oswald Bertram Lower in 1899. It is found in Australia, where it has been recorded from New South Wales.

References

Cosmopteriginae
Moths described in 1899